The 2005 Berlin Marathon was the 32nd edition of the Berlin Marathon. The marathon took place in Berlin, Germany, on 25 September 2005.

The men's race was won by Philip Manyim in 2:07:41 hours and the women's race was won by Mizuki Noguchi in a time of 2:19:12 hours.

Results

Men

Women

References

External links
32st Berlin Marathon

Berlin Marathon
Berlin Marathon
2005 in Berlin
Berlin Marathon